Cloverdale is an unincorporated community in Arlone Township, Pine County, Minnesota, United States.

State Highway 48 (MN 48) and Pine County Road 21 are two of the main routes in the community.

Cloverdale is located ten miles east of Hinckley; and 18 miles west of Danbury, Wisconsin.

Bear Creek flows through the community.

St. Croix State Park and St. Croix State Forest are immediately east of Cloverdale.

The community was originally known as Turpville.

References

 Rand McNally Road Atlas – 2007 edition – Minnesota entry
 Official State of Minnesota Highway Map – 2011/2012 edition

Unincorporated communities in Minnesota
Unincorporated communities in Pine County, Minnesota